The 1907 News of the World Match Play was the fifth News of the World Match Play tournament. It was played from Tuesday 15 to Thursday 17 October at Sunningdale Golf Club. 32 players competed in a straight knock-out competition, with each match contested over 18 holes, except for the final which was over 36 holes. The winner received £100 out of a total prize fund of £240. James Braid defeated J.H. Taylor 4 & 2 in the final to win the tournament.

Qualification
Entry was restricted to members of the Professional Golfers' Association (PGA). Qualification was by a series of 36-hole stroke-play competitions; one for each of the six PGA sections. The number of entries from each section were adjusted. The Southern section had 14 qualifiers, the Northern section 6, the Midland and the Scottish sections 4 and the Irish and Welsh sections 2. In the event of a tie for places there was a playoff.

The qualifiers were:

Irish section: James Edmundson, Charlie Pope
Midland section: George Coburn, Alfred Lewis, Jack Oke, Tom Williamson
Northern section: George Duncan, Sandy Herd, Bill Leaver, George Pulford, Ted Ray, Charles Roberts
Southern section: Albert Bellworthy, James Bradbeer, James Braid, Ernest Gaudin, Ernest Gray, Rowland Jones, Anthony Kettley, James Kinnell, Charles Mayo, Bob McKenzie, Arthur Mitchell, James Sherlock, J.H. Taylor, Harry Vardon
Scottish section: Tom Drummond, Alex Marling, Robert Thomson, Tom Watt
Welsh section: Jack Ross, Sam Whiting

Format
The format was unchanged. Matches were over 18 holes except for the final which was over 36 holes. Extra holes were played in the event of a tied match. Two rounds were played on the first day, two more on the second day with the final on the third day.

Results
Source:

w/o = Walkover

Prize money
The winner received £100 and a gold medal, the runner-up £30 and a silver medal, the losing semi-finalists £15 and a bronze medal, while the third round losers received £10 and the second round losers received £5.

References

Golf tournaments in England
News of the World Match Play
News of the World Match Play
October 1907 sports events